Shiva Raichandani (born 1993) is a non-binary British-Indian film and TV director, producer, writer, dancer, and actor. Their works exist at the intersections of creating positive gender-diverse representation in mainstream media, addressing mental health stigma (especially within the South Asian context), and using the performing arts to drive positive social change.

Raichandani is known for having been a semi-finalist on Britain's Got Talent, and a contestant on India's Got Talent and France's Got Talent with the London School of Bollywood.

In November 2019, Raichandani began production on Queer Parivaar, an upcoming short film based on interfaith queer love.

In May 2021, Raichandani won the inaugural Netflix Documentary Talent Fund to create a film on Shane 'ShayShay' Konno and their Pan-Asian drag and cabaret collective, The Bitten Peach. As reported by Variety, the documentary's working title is 'Peach Paradise'.

Raichandani also works as a consultant on diversity and inclusion within the entertainment industry at large.

Appearances 

 Cannes Lions (2019) - Along with Asad Dhunna of The Unmistakables, Raichandani addressed the topic 'Why We Don't Need Another Diversity Talk' through a performance with a custom track "Hell No", a parody of the popular Slumdog Millionaire song 'Jai Ho'.
Britain's Got Talent (2017) - Raichandani, along with the London School of Bollywood, challenged Bollywood's heteronormative narratives by bringing gender fluidity to the forefront and making it to the semi-finals.
 India's Got Talent (2018) - Raichandani competed with the London School of Bollywood and performed with Karan Johar on the main stage. In a blog post Raichandani writes: "With a routine like this in which a non-binary gender fluid 'star' takes center stage instead of the quintessential 'hero' and 'heroine', we hoped to add to the discourse around gender fluidity and queerness that is too often ignored in the Bollywood industry."
France's Got Talent (2018) - Raichandani competed with the London School of Bollywood performing their routine around gender fluidity. 
 Netflix (2018) - Raichandani was featured in a video titled What I Wish You Knew: About Being Nonbinary, where they discussed gender identity with Jacob Tobia, Liv Hewson, and Lachlan Watson.
TEDx London (2018) - Raichandani gave the introductory remarks of the event by touching upon non-binary representation in Bollywood.
Google's 'I am Remarkable' (2020) - Raichandani delivered the keynote discussing positive gender-diverse representation in Bollywood dance and storytelling.

Raichandani has also been featured on UK Black Pride, Pride in London, Instagram, Bollyshake, and London Queer Fashion Show.

Filmography 

Raichandani produces films under their production company Raisilience Ltd.

References 

Living people
1993 births
Britain's Got Talent contestants
Indonesian dancers
Indonesian people of Indian descent
LGBT dancers
Indonesian LGBT people
Non-binary artists